Orlengate was one of the biggest political affairs in modern Polish history. Disclosed in 2004, the scandal began with the arrest, on 7 February 2002, by the Urząd Ochrony Państwa (UOP, Office for State Protection) of Andrzej Modrzejewski, the CEO of PKN Orlen. In 2004 the Sejm (the lower house of the Polish parliament) initiated the PKN Orlen investigation commission to investigate the scandal.

Modrzejewski had been arrested on the order of the attorney general's office. The arrest was a source of controversy from the outset, carried out on the eve of a meeting of the board of directors. Two hours before the meeting Modrzejewki was released and the board of directors removed him from his position.

Wiesław Kaczmarek (Treasury Minister until January 6, 2003) stated in an interview for Gazeta Wyborcza published on 2 April 2004 that the real purpose of the arrest was to provoke Modrzejewki's dismissal and, as a consequence, not allow signing of a contract for oil supplies worth $14 billion.  According to this interview the decision of the arrest was taken during an unofficial meeting in the Prime Minister's cabinet with Leszek Miller, Barbara Piwnik (Minister of Justice) and Zbigniew Siemiątkowski, the Chief of UOP.  Wiesław Kaczmarek, who was also one of the participants, disclosed the purpose of the meeting to avoid possible future accusations of a misconduct during his office of Treasury Minister.

PKN Orlen investigation commission

After the publication of the article the Katowice attorney's office began their investigation into the case. The Sejm's official commission for special services, also known as PKN Orlen investigation commission, started an independent investigation on 2 July 2004 and found that the UOP put pressure on the attorney's office. The Agencja Bezpieczeństwa Wewnętrznego (State Security Agency) denied it. In April 2004 the commission for special services proposed a special investigative commission. This decision was taken by the Sejm on 6 July 2004.

The commission discovered new threads in the case, and on 21 October 2004 it published notes from the Intelligence Agency describing a meeting between Jan Kulczyk and Władimir Ałganow in July 2003. Jan Kulczyk was explaining the importance of his contacts with Aleksander Kwaśniewski who could enable a privatisation of Rafineria Gdańska on advantageous conditions for Russians.

The commission did not, however, reach a conclusion.  According to public opinion, it was considered a political tool of the rightist opposition parties (Law and Justice, Civic Platform, League of Polish Families) to destroy the presidential aspirations of Włodzimierz Cimoszewicz.

Commission members
 Józef Gruszka, Polish Peasant Party (PSL) - chairman
 Roman Giertych, League of Polish Families (LPR) - vice-chairman
 Zbigniew Wassermann, Law and Justice (PiS) - vice-chairman
 Andrzej Aumiller, Labor Union (UP) - vice-chairman
 Bogdan Bujak, Democratic Left Alliance (SLD) - member
 Andrzej Rożański, Democratic Left Alliance (SLD) - member
 Andrzej Grzesik, Self-Defence of the Republic of Poland (SRP) - member
 Andrzej Celiński, Social Democracy of Poland (SDPL) - member
 Konstanty Miodowicz, Civic Platform (PO) - member
 Zbigniew Witaszek, Federated Parliamentary Club (FKP) - member
 Antoni Macierewicz, Catholic-National Movement (RKN) - member

Political scandals in Poland
History of Poland (1989–present)
2002 in Poland
Corruption in Poland